Aina was a town of ancient Crete.

Its site is tentatively located near Kastelli.

References

Populated places in ancient Crete
Former populated places in Greece